Distance is a numerical or occasionally qualitative measurement of how far apart objects or points are. In physics or everyday usage, distance may refer to a physical length or an estimation based on other criteria (e.g. "two counties over").  Since spatial cognition is a rich source of conceptual metaphors in human thought, the term is also frequently used metaphorically to mean a measurement of the amount of difference between two similar objects (such as statistical distance between probability distributions or edit distance between strings of text) or a degree of separation (as exemplified by distance between people in a social network).  Most such notions of distance, both physical and metaphorical, are formalized in mathematics using the notion of a metric space.

In the social sciences, distance can refer to a qualitative measurement of separation, such as social distance or psychological distance.

Distances in physics and geometry

The distance between physical locations can be defined in different ways in different contexts.

Straight-line or Euclidean distance

The distance between two points in physical space is the length of a straight line between them, which is the shortest possible path.  This is the usual meaning of distance in classical physics, including Newtonian mechanics. 

Straight-line distance is formalized mathematically as the Euclidean distance in two- and three-dimensional space. In coordinate geometry, Euclidean distance is computed using the Pythagorean theorem.

Similarly, given points (x1, y1, z1) and (x2, y2, z2) in three-dimensional space, the distance between them is:

This idea generalizes to higher-dimensional Euclidean spaces.

Measurement 

There are many ways of measuring straight-line distances. For example, it can be done directly using a ruler, or indirectly with a radar (for long distances) or interferometry (for very short distances).  The cosmic distance ladder is a set of ways of measuring extremely long distances.

Shortest-path distance on a curved surface

The straight-line distance between two points on the surface of the Earth is not very useful for most purposes, since we cannot tunnel straight through the Earth's mantle.  Instead, one typically measures the shortest path along the surface of the Earth, as the crow flies.  This is approximated mathematically by the great-circle distance on a sphere.

More generally, the shortest path between two points along a curved surface is known as a geodesic.  The arc length of geodesics gives a way of measuring distance from the perspective of an ant or other flightless creature living on that surface.

Effects of relativity

In the theory of relativity, because of phenomena such as length contraction and the relativity of simultaneity, distances between objects depend on a choice of inertial frame of reference.  On galactic and larger scales, the measurement of distance is also affected by the expansion of the universe.  In practice, a number of distance measures are used in cosmology to quantify such distances.

Other spatial distances

Unusual definitions of distance can be helpful to model certain physical situations, but are also used in theoretical mathematics:
 In practice, one is often interested in the travel distance between two points along roads, rather than as the crow flies.  In a grid plan, the travel distance between street corners is given by the Manhattan distance: the number of east–west and north–south blocks one must traverse to get between those two points.
 Chessboard distance, formalized as Chebyshev distance, is the minimum number of moves a king must make on a chessboard in order to travel between two squares.

Metaphorical distances
Many abstract notions of distance used in mathematics, science and engineering represent a degree of difference or separation between similar objects.  This page gives a few examples.

Statistical distances

In statistics and information geometry, statistical distances measure the degree of difference between two probability distributions.  There are many kinds of statistical distances, typically formalized as divergences; these allow a set of probability distributions to be understood as a geometrical object called a statistical manifold.  The most elementary is the squared Euclidean distance, which is minimized by the least squares method; this is the most basic Bregman divergence. The most important in information theory is the relative entropy (Kullback–Leibler divergence), which allows one to analogously study maximum likelihood estimation geometrically; this is an example of both an f-divergence and a Bregman divergence (and in fact the only example which is both). Statistical manifolds corresponding to Bregman divergences are flat manifolds in the corresponding geometry, allowing an analog of the Pythagorean theorem (which holds for squared Euclidean distance) to be used for linear inverse problems in inference by optimization theory.

Other important statistical distances include the Mahalanobis distance and the energy distance.

Edit distances
In computer science, an edit distance or string metric between two strings measures how different they are. For example, the words "dog" and "dot", which differ by just one letter, are closer than "dog" and "cat", which have no letters in common.  This idea is used in spell checkers and in coding theory, and is mathematically formalized in a number of different ways, including Levenshtein distance, Hamming distance, Lee distance, and Jaro–Winkler distance.

Distance in graph theory

In a graph, the distance between two vertices is measured by the length of the shortest edge path between them.  For example, if the graph represents a social network, then the idea of six degrees of separation can be interpreted mathematically as saying that the distance between any two vertices is at most six.  Similarly, the Erdős number and the Bacon number—the number of collaborative relationships away a person is from prolific mathematician Paul Erdős and actor Kevin Bacon, respectively—are distances in the graphs whose edges represent mathematical or artistic collaborations.

In the social sciences
In psychology, human geography, and the social sciences, distance is often theorized not as an objective numerical measurement, but as a qualitative description of a subjective experience.  For example, psychological distance is "the different ways in which an object might be removed from" the self along dimensions such as "time, space, social distance, and hypotheticality".  In sociology, social distance describes the separation between individuals or social groups in society along dimensions such as social class, race/ethnicity, gender or sexuality.

Mathematical formalization

Most of the notions of distance between two points or objects described above are examples of the mathematical idea of a metric.  A metric or distance function is a function  which takes pairs of points or objects to real numbers and satisfies the following rules:
 The distance between an object and itself is always zero.
 The distance between distinct objects is always positive.
As an exception, many of the divergences used in statistics are not metrics.

Distance between sets

There are multiple ways of measuring the physical distance between objects that consist of more than one point:
 One may measure the distance between representative points such as the center of mass; this is used for astronomical distances such as the Earth–Moon distance.
 One may measure the distance between the closest points of the two objects; in this sense, the altitude of an airplane or spacecraft is its distance from the Earth.  The same sense of distance is used in Euclidean geometry to define distance from a point to a line, distance from a point to a plane, or, more generally, perpendicular distance between affine subspaces.
 Even more generally, this idea can be used to define the distance between two subsets of a metric space.
 The Hausdorff distance between two subsets of a metric space can be thought of as measuring how far they are from perfectly overlapping. (Here "farthest point" must be interpreted as a supremum.) The Hausdorff distance defines a metric on the set of compact subsets of a metric space.

Related ideas

The word distance is also used for related concepts that are not encompassed by the description "a numerical measurement of how far apart points or objects are".

Distance travelled
The distance travelled by an object is the length of a specific path travelled between two points, such as the distance walked while navigating a maze.  This can even be a closed distance along a closed curve which starts and ends at the same point, such as a ball thrown straight up, or the Earth when it completes one orbit.  This is formalized mathematically as the arc length of the curve.

The distance travelled may also be signed: a "forward" distance is positive and a "backward" distance is negative.

Circular distance is the distance traveled by a point on the circumference of a wheel, which can be useful to consider when designing vehicles or mechanical gears (see also odometry).

Displacement and directed distance

The displacement in classical physics measures the change in position of an object during an interval of time.  While distance is a scalar quantity, or a magnitude, displacement is a vector quantity with both magnitude and direction.  In general, the vector measuring the difference between two locations (the relative position) is sometimes called the directed distance.  For example, the directed distance from the New York City Main Library flag pole to the Statue of Liberty flag pole has: 
 A starting point: library flag pole
 An ending point: statue flag pole
 A direction: -38°
 A distance: 8.72 km

Signed distance

See also 

Absolute difference
Astronomical system of units
Color difference
Closeness (mathematics)
Distance geometry problem
Dijkstra's algorithm
Distance matrix
Distance set
Engineering tolerance
Multiplicative distance
Optical path length
Orders of magnitude (length)
Proper length
Proxemics – physical distance between people
Signed distance function
Similarity measure
Social distancing
Vertical distance

Library support 

 Python (programming language)
 Interspace -A package for finding the distance between two vectors, numbers and strings.
 SciPy -Distance computations (scipy.spatial.distance)
Julia (programming language)
Julia Statistics Distance -A Julia package for evaluating distances (metrics) between vectors.

References

Bibliography